Jhonny David Perozo Rodríguez (28 April 1985 – 25 May 2014) was a Venezuelan footballer who last played as defender for Zulia FC.

He and one of his friends were murdered on 25 May 2014 during a fight in an entertainment center in Lagunillas.

References

1985 births
2014 deaths
People from Zulia
Venezuelan footballers
Venezuelan Primera División players
Carabobo F.C. players
Male murder victims
Venezuelan murder victims
People murdered in Venezuela
Deaths by firearm in Venezuela
Association football defenders
2014 murders in Venezuela
21st-century Venezuelan people